Carl E. Morris (February 23, 1887 – July 11, 1951) was a professional boxer who was known as the Oklahoma White Hope. He was a heavyweight, fighting at 225–240 pounds. He was 6 feet 4 inches tall.

Biography
He was born on February 23, 1887, in Fulton, Kentucky. On December 16, 1918, he lost a fight to Jack Dempsey at the Louisiana Auditorium in New Orleans. In later life he worked as a steam shovel operator. He died on July 11, 1951, in Pasadena, California, of cancer.

References

External links
Carl E. Morris at Flickr Commons

1887 births
1951 deaths
People from Fulton, Kentucky
Boxers from Oklahoma
Bare-knuckle boxers
American male boxers
Heavyweight boxers